Sir Peter Alexander Clutterbuck  (27 March 1897 – 29 December 1975) was a British diplomat who was high commissioner to Canada and India and ambassador to Ireland.

Life and career
Alexander's father, Sir Peter Clutterbuck, was an Inspector General of Forests in India and Burma. 

Peter Alexander Clutterbuck was educated at Malvern College and Pembroke College, Cambridge. During World War I, he served in the Coldstream Guards and was awarded the Military Cross and a mention in dispatches. After the war he entered the Civil Service, at first in the Post Office, transferring to the Colonial Office in 1922. 

He was secretary to the Donoughmore Commission 1927–28, and a member of the UK delegations to the League of Nations General Assembly in 1929, 1930 and 1931. He was secretary to the Newfoundland Royal Commission in 1933. He was High Commissioner to Canada 1946–52 and to India 1952–55. His term in India was cut short by ill health: he was advised not to continue to serve in a tropical climate and was appointed ambassador to the Republic of Ireland 1955–59. 

Finally, he was Permanent Under-Secretary at the Commonwealth Relations Office 1959–61.

Clutterbuck was appointed CMG in the 1943 New Year Honours, knighted KCMG in the New Year Honours of 1946 and raised to GCMG in the Queen's Birthday Honours of 1952.

Above all Alec Clutterbuck was a Christian and a gentleman. Such phrases may sound out of fashion today, but there will be many past and present members of the service who will remember him with gratitude and affection and will recall the guiding lights of his life – loyalty, devotion to duty, integrity and, supremely, the Christian virtues of humility and charity.

References
CLUTTERBUCK, Sir (Peter) Alexander, Who Was Who, A & C Black, 1920–2008; online edn, Oxford University Press, Dec 2012
Sir Alexander Clutterbuck (obituary), The Times, London, 31 December 1975, page 12

External links

1897 births
1975 deaths
British Army personnel of World War I
Coldstream Guards officers
People educated at Malvern College
Alumni of Pembroke College, Cambridge
High Commissioners of the United Kingdom to Canada
High Commissioners of the United Kingdom to India
Ambassadors of the United Kingdom to Ireland
Knights Grand Cross of the Order of St Michael and St George
Recipients of the Military Cross
Civil servants in the Commonwealth Relations Office